Asprella may refer to two different genera:
 Asprella Schaufuss, 1869, a synonym for Conus, a genus of snails
 Asprella Schreb., a synonym for Leersia, a genus of grasses